Blaker is a village in Sweden.

Blaker may also refer to:
People
Blaker (surname)

Places
Blaker Station
Blaker (Netherlands)

See also